Palapathwela ( Sinhala:පලාපත්වෙල, Tamil:பலாபத்வெல ) is a suburb of Matale, Sri Lanka. It is located in Matale District, Central Province.The Kandy-Jafna main road (A-9 road) runs through Palapathwela. The population of the suburb, according to the 2012 census, was 1,989.

Local Government Council
Palapathwela is administrated by the Matale Divisional Secretariat.

Education 
Government Schools   
 Buddhagosha Maha Vidyalaya
 Tamil Vidyalaya

Facilities 
There are Two Banks available for general financial needs
 Bank of Ceylon
 Cooperative Bank (A rural Bank which supports Western Union Money transfer)
 Cargills Food City

 Rural Development Bank

 Pradeshiya Sabha

See also
List of towns in Central Province, Sri Lanka

References

External links

Populated places in Matale District